Leonídio de Pra (born 5 September 1961) is a Brazilian volleyball player. He competed in the men's tournament at the 1988 Summer Olympics.

References

External links
 

1961 births
Living people
Brazilian men's volleyball players
Olympic volleyball players of Brazil
Volleyball players at the 1988 Summer Olympics
Volleyball players from Rio de Janeiro (city)
Pan American Games medalists in volleyball
Pan American Games bronze medalists for Brazil
Medalists at the 1987 Pan American Games